The 2013 World Indoor Bowls Championship was held at Potters Leisure Resort, Hopton-on-Sea, Great Yarmouth, England, in January 2013.

The event was sponsored by Fred. Olsen Cruise Lines and was the 35th annual World Indoor Bowls Championships.
The men's singles title was won by Stewart Anderson, while the ladies singles was won by Rebecca Field.

The 2013 tournament saw the introduction of the shot clock, used for the first time at the World Championships. It was previously trialled at the 2012 Scottish International Open and has been used in Australia. Each player is allowed 30 seconds to play their shot, and if they run out of time, the hooter will sound and their bowl is removed. However, players can use up to four time-outs in a match - which resets the clock to 60 seconds - and are given an extra time-out if the match goes to a tie-break set.

Winners

Draw and results

Men's singles

Finals

Top half

Bottom half

Women's singles

Open Pairs

Mixed Pairs

References

External links
Official website

2013 in bowls
World Indoor Bowls Championship